You've Always Got the Blues is a 1988 album by Kate Ceberano and Wendy Matthews recorded as the soundtrack for the ABC TV series Stringer. The album is primarily composed of duets performed by Ceberano and Matthews but also features Joy Smithers and Martin Armiger. According to Ceberano's 2014 autobiography, she and Matthews recorded the album in 48 hours.

The album received two ARIA Awards in 1989, for Best Female Artist (Kate Ceberano) and Best Original Soundtrack/Cast/Show Recording. It was also nominated for Best Female Artist (Wendy Matthews), Best Jazz Album and Best Adult Contemporary Album.

Track listing

Charts
The album debuted and peaked at number No. 7 on 26 June 1988 on the ARIA Albums Chart and was certified platinum in Australia.

Weekly charts

Year-end charts

Certification

Personnel

Musicians
 Tony Buchanan – alto saxophone, baritone saxophone  
 Graham Jesse – horns 
 Kate Ceberano – vocals
 Wendy Matthews – vocals 
 Joy Smithers – vocals ("Young Love")
 Joe Creighton – bass 
 Ricky Fataar – drums 
 Ken Francis – guitar ("The Girl in the Picture", "Young Love")
 Rex Goh – guitar 
 Martin Armiger – keyboards, vocals ("Don't You Take It Too Bad") 
 Andrew Thomas Wilson – hammond organ ("Guilty (Through Neglect)", "Stringer") 
 Kenny Kitchings – pedal steel guitar 
 Max Lambert – piano 
 Col Loughnan – tenor saxophone 
 Paul Panici – trumpet, flugelhorn

Production
 Producer – Martin Armiger 
 Recording, Mixing – Mike Stavrou 
 Mastering – Don Bartley

References

ARIA Award-winning albums
Kate Ceberano albums
Wendy Matthews albums
Collaborative albums
1988 albums
Soundtracks by Australian artists
1988 soundtrack albums
Jazz albums by Australian artists